The Manufacturing Technologies Association (MTA) is a UK trade association representing the manufacturing technologies industry. The MTA sits at the core of the engineering based manufacturing sector and as an association works tirelessly to ensure member companies are as commercially successful as possible.

The association's key activities include:
- Representing engineering based manufacturing and supporting the advanced engineering sector through lobbying, media contact and networking.
- Providing relevant and specific industry intelligence 
- Encouraging talent through funding and support for workplace training and education initiatives in schools, colleges and universities.
- Delivering the UK's only major exhibition focused on manufacturing technologies – MACH (owned and organised by the MTA)

Membership of the MTA is open to companies involved with the manufacturing technologies sector and end users of such technology.

Function
The MTA represents UK companies, their associates and affiliates who drive UK manufacturing technology, innovation and quality.

The website contains a member & product directory by geographic position. It also provides information and statistics on the economic health of the British manufacturing markets.

MTA is the owner and organiser of the UK's premier manufacturing event - the MACH exhibition, a week-long event held biennially in April at the NEC.

The types of manufacturing technologies covered by the organisation, and the exhibition, include:
 Metalcutting
 Metalforming
 Automation and robotics
 CAD/CAM
 Engineering lasers
 Measurement and inspection
 Tooling and workholding
 Welding and metal fabrication
 Rapid manufacturing and rapid prototyping

History
The original Machine Tools Trades Association (MTTA) was formed in 1919, becoming the Machine Tools Technologies Association. Since its formation the association has evolved into a trade body with a global support network, promoting internationally competitive trade in manufacturing technologies.

Structure
The MTA is based in London, with close contact with the British Government through the Department of Business Innovation and Skills (BIS) (United Kingdom), CBI and UK Trade & Investment.

The association's offices are located on Bayswater Road (A402) next to Lancaster Gate tube station.

The association also provides a secretariat service to the Federation of British Hand Tool Manufacturers (FBHTM), and the MTA Tooling Group, formerly the British Hard Metal and Engineers' Cutting Tools Association (BHECTA).

See also
 Manufacturing in the United Kingdom
 EMO (European trade show)
 MACH Exhibition (UK trade show)

References

External links
 MTA
 MACH Exhibition

Trade associations based in the United Kingdom
Organizations established in 1919
Tool manufacturing companies of the United Kingdom
Organisations based in the City of Westminster
Electronics industry in London
Technology trade associations